Natalie Di Luccio (born 29 June 1989) is an Italian-Canadian classical-crossover singer from Toronto, Ontario. 
She is often referred to as "Bollywood's Soprano" because of her unique renditions of Indian classics.

Her career began in 2010 when she released music videos on YouTube of Bollywood film songs, which went viral and caught the attention of Grammy and Oscar Award winning composer A. R. Rahman. Di Luccio was later invited to perform with composer Amit Trivedi as well as on Coke Studio on MTV India. She started her professional career in Bollywood with notable playback singer Sonu Nigam and has been a singer for various feature film soundtracks (English Vinglish, Ladies vs Ricky Bahl, and Chennai Express). Di Luccio has also worked with legendary Italian music producer Mauro Malavasi (Andrea Bocelli, Luciano Pavarotti) in Bologna, Italy.

Early life
Di Luccio was born on 29 June 1989 in Toronto, Ontario, and trained to be a classical singer. Her father is from Agropoli, Campania, Italy and her mother is from Montreal, Quebec, Canada. She was a student at Cardinal Carter Academy for the Arts. She went to McGill University to study Western classical voice and pursue a career in music. She has said that some of her musical influences growing up were singers like Andrea Bocelli, Celine Dion and Josh Groban.

Di Luccio began working with multi-platinum Canadian music producer Matthew Tishler at the age of 13 and continues to work with him today.

Career
Di Luccio's link with Bollywood started when she received a message over Myspace to record a small part in Sonu Nigam's devotional album, Maha Ganesha, in 2009. She later went on to record a Michael Jackson tribute song with Sonu Nigam.

Di Luccio shot to fame when she recorded and released on YouTube her version of a popular Bollywood song, "Tu Jaane Na". This music video reached over 1 million views overnight. After her YouTube success she was asked to be a part of many reality shows including Indian reality TV show Bigg Boss, but rejected these offers to focus on her music.

She performed with Amit Trivedi and Shriram Iyer the song "Bari Bari" produced by Amit Trivedi, on Coke Studio, Season 2 broadcast on MTV India and DD National (National Channel of India).

In 2013, Di Luccio worked with Italian music producer Mauro Malavasi (Andrea Bocelli, Luciano Pavarotti). She spent time in Bologna connecting with her roots and recording new material with Malavasi. 

In 2013, Di Luccio sang a Gujarati song called "Prarthana". This was the first time a western classical piece had been sung in this language.

Di Luccio caught the attention of Grammy and Oscar winning composer A. R. Rahman and continues to join him on several occasions for live concerts across India. She made her Tamil music debut with "Aila Aila" composed by Rahman for the film I directed by Shankar. She performed the song live at the televised audio launch in Chennai on 15 September 2014. The launch was witnessed by honorary guests Arnold Schwarzenegger and Rajnikanth.

In May 2015 Di Luccio was a TEDxGateway speaker in Mumbai at NCPA Theatre. She spoke about the importance of getting out of one's comfort zone and about how music brought her to India.

Di Luccio has sung an Arabic piece for the soundtrack of the film "Muhammad: The Messenger of God" directed by Majid Majidi and composed by A.R.Rahman.

Personal life
Di Luccio was in a relationship with Indian film and television actor Eijaz Khan from 2011 to 2015. They met on a plane during one of her initial visits to Mumbai. She said that Khan was the inspiration for her first Hindi song.

In 2018, Natalie married MTV Roadies creator Raghu Ram. On 6 January 2020, they were blessed with a baby boy named Rhythm.

Television
Di Luccio joined Season 4 of Life Mein Ek Baar, an adventure travel show on Fox Life India. The series was shot in Hong Kong and premiered on 20 October 2015.

In May 2017, Di Luccio became a part of Nexa Journeys on the Asian Highway 1, a unique reality travel show which premiered on Discovery Channel India. Di Luccio, along with four known personalities, (Saransh Goila, Pallavi Sharda, Taras Taraporvala, and Girish Karkera), drove all the way from India to Thailand via Myanmar on the Asian Highway 1. Di Luccio collaborated with many local musicians along the way, most notably with Rewben Mashangva in Kohima, Nagaland.

Filmography

Music videos
 "Tu Jaane Na" – released on YouTube 29 September 2010
 "Kahin To Hogi Wo" – released on YouTube 2 November 2010
 "Pehla Nasha" – released on YouTube 28 April 2011
 "Baby, Te Amo" – released on YouTube 28 May 2012
 "Prarthana" – released on YouTube 19 September 2013
 "Khuda Jaane/Wrecking Ball" – released on YouTube 17 November 2013
 "O Holy Night" – released on YouTube on 12 December 2013
 "Galliyan" – released on YouTube 19 July 2014
 "Aila Aila"
 "Konjam Nilavu" – released on YouTube 18 March 2015
 "Hamari Adhuri Kahani" – released on YouTube 20 August 2015
 "A Dream from Rajasthan (Nella Fantasia)" – released on YouTube 17 March 2016

See also 
 Akon, known for Chammak Challo Bollywood song 
 Arash, known for Boro Boro Bollywood song 
 Kylie Minogue, known for Chiggy Wiggy Bollywood song
 Snoop Dogg, known for Singh is Kinng Bollywood song
 Tata Young, known for Dhoom Dhoom Bollywood song

References

External links

1989 births
Living people
Musicians from Toronto
Canadian women pop singers
Canadian people of Italian descent
McGill University alumni
Canadian playback singers
Canadian expatriates in Italy
Expatriate musicians in India
Canadian expatriates in India
Bollywood playback singers
Tamil playback singers
21st-century Canadian singers
21st-century Canadian women singers